Mascouche station is a commuter rail station operated by Exo in Mascouche, Quebec, Canada, a suburb north of Montreal, Quebec.

It is the northern terminus of the Mascouche line.

The station is located parallel to Rue de la Gare in Mascouche. It is located in a yard with five parallel tracks, but possesses a single side platform face. The platform is a high-level platform, a feature shared only with Gare Centrale, Repentigny, and Terrebonne stations on the commuter train network. The station has a single exit, reached via a tunnel passing under the westernmost track, with stair and elevator access. As a result, the station is wheelchair-accessible. The parking lots and bus loop are reached from Rue de la Gare. 

An artwork by Marc Dulude, a sculpture entitled Continuum, runs along the roof edge of the station entrance building.

Bus Connections

MRC Les Moulins (Urbis) (MRCLM)

References

External links
 Mascouche Commuter Train Station Information (RTM)
 Mascouche Commuter Train Station Schedule (RTM)

Exo commuter rail stations
Railway stations in Lanaudière
Railway stations in Quebec
Transport in Mascouche